The Archdeacon of Lincoln is a senior ecclesiastical officer in the Diocese of Lincoln – he or she has responsibilities within his archdeaconry (the ancient Archdeaconry of Lincoln) including oversight of church buildings and some supervision, discipline and pastoral care of the clergy.

History
The archdeaconry has existed since the 11th century, when archdeacons were first appointed across England, and has remained in the Diocese of Lincoln since. Since ancient times, the territory of the archdeaconry covered all of Lincolnshire (barring the West Riding of Lindsey, the Stow archdeaconry); that territory has remained broadly similar throughout her thousand-year history.

List of archdeacons

High Medieval
bef. 1092–?: Richard (first archdeacon)
c.1100 Albertus Longobardus (the Lombard)
–?: Nicholas
c.1117 William Bajocensis 
?–?1129 Roger de Clinton (afterwards Bishop of Lichfield, 1129)
bef. 1132–?: William of Bayeux
bef. 1145–aft. 1169: Robert
: Richard D'Aumery
–1170: Robert de Chesney
bef. 1171–bef. 1175 (res.): Geoffrey Plantagenet (afterwards Bishop of Lincoln, 1173)
aft. 1175–aft. 1215 (rem.): Peter (half-brother of Geoffrey)
bef. 1219–1223 (res.): William de Thornaco (afterwards Dean of Lincoln, 1223)
1223–1238 (d.): Robert of Hailes
1238–1248 (res.): Thomas Wallensis (afterwards Bishop of St Davids, 1248)
1248–1255 (deprived): William Lupus (Le Loup)
–aft. 1277 (d.): Roger de Fuldon
bef. 1277–12 December 1290 (d.): William de la Gare
bef. 1291–30 May 1319 (exch.): William de Estiniaco (d'Estaing)

Late Medieval
30 May 1319 – 1323 (res.): John de Stratford (afterwards Bishop of Winchester, 1324)
1323– (res.): Archibald de Périgord (bishop's/papal grant)
22 July 1323 – 25 October 1330 (rev.): John Erdeleye (royal grant; revoked)
24 July 1323: Robert Baldock (unsuccessful royal grant)
6 February 1327 – 1331 (d.): Hugh de Camera (royal grant; papal grant in 1330)
26 May 1331 – 1349 (d.): Thomas Northwood/Northwode
1349: John de Offord 
1352: William Askeby/Scoter (unsuccessful papal reservation)
8 May 1354 – 1355 (res.): Hugues Auberti (Hugh Aubert)
18 February 1355 – 10 May 1363 (d.): Audoen Cardinal Aubert (Cardinal priest of Santi Giovanni e Paolo)
23 May 1363 – 1367 (res.): William of Wykeham (afterwards Bishop of Winchester 1367)
bef. 1369–1386 (d.): Richard de Ravenser
5 June 1386–bef. 1390 (d.): Nicholas Chaddesden (claimant)
23 March 1387–September 1401 (res.): Henry Bowet (afterwards Bishop of Wells, 1401) 
bef. 1391–4 March 1391 (rem.): John Thomas 
1 April 1399: William Feriby (royal grant)
23 April 1399: Richard Maudeleyn (collated by bishop)
27 September 1401 – 1403 (d.): John Scarle
25 April 1403 – 1405 (d.): Thomas Bekingham
6 February 1405 – 1431 (d.): Henry Wells
22 September 1407: Anthonio Correr (unsuccessful claimant)
23 October 1431 – 1458 (d.): Richard Cawdrey/Caudray
1458–1463 (d.): Richard Ewen
27 April 1464 – 1471 (d.): John Chadworth

6 August 1471–bef. 1481 (d.): John Rudying
5 November 1481 – 1494 (d.): John Coke
28 July 1494 – 1506 (d.): Thomas Hutton
21 August 1506 – 1528 (d.): William Smith
22 June 1528 – 1542: Richard Pate (later Bishop of Worcester, 1554)

Early modern
8 April 1542 – 1549 (d.): George Heneage (previously Dean of Lincoln, 1528–38)
22 September 1549 – 1554 (deprived): Nicholas Bullingham (deprived)
23 May 1554–December 1558 (d.): Thomas Marshall
27 December 1558 – 15 January 1559 (deprived): Gawin/Owen Hodgson (deprived)
15 January 1559 – 1562: Nicholas Bullingham (restored; also Bishop of Lincoln from 1560)
6 November 1562 – 1577 (res.): John Aylmer (afterwards Bishop of London, 1577)
25 June 1577 – 1580 (res.): William Cole (later Dean of Lincoln, 1598)
1 April 1581 – 1595 (d.): John Barefoot
27 August 1595 – 1612 (d.): Richard Clayton (also Dean of Peterborough, 1590–1612)
11 September 1612 – 1626 (d.): John Hills
25 November 1626 – 1644 (d.): Morgan Wynne
20 August 1645 – 2 February 1667 (d.): Raphael Throckmorton (not installed until the Restoration, 1660)
27 February 1667 – 13 August 1709 (d.): John Cawley
26 August 1687: Thomas Oldys (unsuccessful counter-claimant)
22 October 1709 – 21 January 1725 (d.): John Mandeville (also Dean of Peterborough, 1722–25)
19 July 1725 – 6 June 1769 (d.): George Reynolds
1 July 1769 – 4 January 1793 (d.): John Gordon
13 September 1793 – 5 June 1817 (d.): John Pretyman
11 June 1817 – 8 February 1845 (res.): Charles Goddard
22 February 1845 – 24 December 1862 (d.): Henry Bonney

Late modern
18639 June 1913 (d.): William Kaye
1913–1925 (res.): George Jeudwine
1925–1933 (ret.): John Hine (also Bishop suffragan of Grantham until 1930; Assistant Bishop after 1930)
1933–1937 (res.): Hubert Larken
1938–1947 (res.): Kenneth Warner
1947–1951 (res.): Kenneth Lamplugh
1951–1958 (res.): Kenneth Healey
1960–1976 (ret.): Arthur Smith (afterwards archdeacon emeritus)
1977–1983 (res.): Michael Adie
1983–1988 (res.): Ronald Milner
1988–1995 (ret.): Michael Brackenbury (afterwards archdeacon emeritus)
1995–2008 (ret.): Arthur Hawes (afterwards archdeacon emeritus)
September 2009November 2015 (res.): Tim Barker
27 November 2015 – 27 March 2016 (Acting): Geoffrey Arrand, Archdeacon emeritus of Suffolk
27 March 2016–priest: Gavin Kirk

References

Sources

Lists of Anglicans
 
Lists of English people